The Serbian Social Democratic Party (abbr ССДП or SSDP) was a left-wing political party in Kingdom of Serbia that was formed in 1903. Prominent leaders included Dimitrije Tucović, Dragiša Lapčević, and Dušan A. Popović.

It ceased to exist after World War I with the creation of the Kingdom of Serbs, Croats and Slovenes, when in 1919 the social democrats joined the new Socialist Workers' Party of Yugoslavia (of Communists) (Socijalistička radnička partija Jugoslavije (komunista)), the predecessor of the Communist Party of Yugoslavia.

History
The Serbian Social Democratic Party was founded on 2 August 1903 in Belgrade. The founding congress adopted a program modeled after the Erfurt Program of the German Social Democratic Party.

In 1903 a split emerged within the SSDP between the Marxists, led by Radovan Dragović and Dimitrije Tucović, and the so-called "opportunists", who insisted on the primacy of trade unionism over political struggle. In December 1904 the opportunists were expelled from the party.

In 1909 and 1910 the Marxist wing struggled against the anarcho-syndicalist wing.

The SSDP participated in the First Balkan Socialist Conference held on 7–9 January 1910 in Belgrade.

At the outbreak of World War I the Social Democratic deputies to the National Assembly refused to vote for war credits. The mobilization and the Austro-Hungarian occupation of the Kingdom of Serbia from October 1915 weakened the SSDP. During the revolutionary upswing that occurred in Serbia under the influence of the October Revolution, the SSDP merged with the Socialist Workers’ Party of Yugoslavia (of Communists) at the latter’s first (Unification) Congress, held in April 1919.

Electoral performance

References

External links
 Foster, Samuel. (2018). Reviving the Völkerabfälle: The South Slavonic Left, Balkan Federalism and the Creation of the First Yugoslavia. Socialist History. 53:47-68. Retrieved 22 April 2020.  

Political parties established in 1903
Defunct political parties in Serbia
Social democratic parties in Serbia
1903 establishments in Serbia
Socialism in the Kingdom of Serbia
Political parties in the Kingdom of Serbia